Catoptria falsella is a species of moth of the family Crambidae. The species also goes by the common name Chequered Grass-veneer.

It is found in Europe. It is nocturnal. The wingspan is 18–24 mm. The moth flies from June to September depending on the location.

The larvae feed on various mosses, especially Tortula muralis.

References

External links
 waarneming.nl 
 Lepidoptera of Belgium
 Catoptria falsella at UKmoths

Crambini
Moths of Europe
Moths described in 1775